Harold Houghton (26 August 1906 – 3 February 1986) was a professional association footballer, who played as an inside forward for four teams in the Football League, amassing 322 appearances and scoring 112 goals between 1927 and 1937.

Having played as a child for Anfield Social Club, he joined Everton in January 1922, while still aged 15. He turned professional with them in December 1923, aged 17, but he would have to wait until 1927 before he finally made his only first team appearance. He joined Exeter City for a fee of £350 in June 1928, and went on to make 207 League appearances and score 79 goals in just under six years with them.

Norwich City paid £550 to sign Houghton in March 1934, and he moved to Bristol Rovers on 1 November 1935. While at Rovers he was the club's top goalscorer during the 1936–37 season with 14 goals. He returned to his home city in 1937, where he played for South Liverpool.

References

1906 births
1986 deaths
Footballers from Liverpool
English footballers
Association football forwards
Everton F.C. players
Exeter City F.C. players
Norwich City F.C. players
Bristol Rovers F.C. players
South Liverpool F.C. players
English Football League players